Mitchell Joseph (born 2 September 1986, in Dominica) is a footballer who plays as a striker for the Dominica national football team.

International Goals
Scores and results list Dominica's goal tally first.

References

1986 births
Living people
Dominica footballers
Dominica international footballers
Bath Estate FC players
Association football forwards